Rock Cliff is a historic farm property at 12615 Norwood Road, near Wingina in Nelson County, Virginia. The property was developed beginning in 1854, the year the main house, a wood frame I-house, was built. It was developed by Dr. William Horsley, divided amongst his five children, and then reassembled by his grandson. The farm complex also includes a 19th-century smokehouse, kitchen, and doctor's office, as well as the c. 1860 Horsley family cemetery.

The farm was listed on the National Register of Historic Places in 2015.

See also
National Register of Historic Places listings in Nelson County, Virginia

References

Farms on the National Register of Historic Places in Virginia
National Register of Historic Places in Nelson County, Virginia
Buildings and structures in Nelson County, Virginia
Federal architecture in Virginia
1825 establishments in Virginia
Historic districts on the National Register of Historic Places in Virginia